KMGO (98.7 MHz) is a radio station licensed to serve Centerville, Iowa, United States.

KMGO broadcasts a locally programmed New Country format and is the Iowa affiliate for AccuWeather, FOX News Radio, FOX Business Network, and FOX Sports Radio.

References

External links
FCC Public File
Website

MGO
Radio stations established in 1974